Korong Vale is a town in north western Victoria.

Korongvale Post Office opened on 17 May 1879 and was renamed Korong Vale around 1945.

Korong Vale—as the junction of the Kulwin and Robinvale railway lines—was a major railway town for many years and much of the population was made up of railway staff and their families.  The local railway station also had a locomotive depot and railway yard. In 2009 the only rail infrastructure remaining was a single crossing loop and a single point for the junction for the lines to Kulwin and Robinvale.

Post WW2, Korong Vale was a thriving town servicing the railway and farming community.  In the town centre, there was Harrisons Hardware Store, a clothing store, a bakery, a butchers, McTaggerts Foundry, Mathews Hotel and a cafe.  There was Korong Vale Primary school, bowling green, tennis courts, and Korong Vale football and netball club. The town hall remains.

Golfers play at the course of the Korong Vale Golf Club.

References

Towns in Victoria (Australia)
Shire of Loddon